Concert for Diana was a benefit concert held at the newly built Wembley Stadium in London, United Kingdom in honour of Diana, Princess of Wales, on 1 July 2007, which would have been her 46th birthday. 31 August that year brought the 10th anniversary of her death. The concert was hosted by Diana's sons, Prince William and Prince Harry, who helped to organise many of the world's most famous entertainers and singers to perform. Proceeds from the concert went to Diana's charities, as well as to charities of which William and Harry are patrons.

The concert was broadcast in 140 different countries across the world with an estimated potential audience of 500 million. In December 2006, 22,500 tickets were made available for purchase for the concert, selling out in just 17 minutes. 63,000 people turned out to Wembley Stadium to watch the performances to commemorate Diana. At the end of the performances, a video montage of Diana as a child was presented, accompanied by the Queen song "These Are the Days of Our Lives".

The concert started at 16:00 BST and finished at approximately 22:15 BST – there were two short intermissions during the concert. A 2-Disc DVD set of the full concert was released on 5 November 2007. A Blu-ray high definition release of the full concert and documentary was released in November 2008.

Planning

In pre-concert interview, Prince William listed Michael Jackson as one of Diana's most favourite music acts, but Jackson did not appear on the show.

In one of the many tabloid stories that surfaced relating to the concert and the following week's Live Earth event, it was alleged that Madonna, the Red Hot Chili Peppers, Keane, and other acts were set to play at the concert but were lost to Live Earth. The concert organisers were apparently trying to secure their top acts, and are also being pressured into rethinking their lineup to appeal to younger people, and compare to Live Earth.

Catherine Middleton, now Prince William's wife, and Chelsy Davy, the now ex-girlfriend of Prince Harry, attended the concert. It has been rumoured that they were involved in helping to plan the event.

Queen guitarist Brian May was expected to perform alongside Joss Stone in her version of "Under Pressure", but pulled out of accompanying after finding the new arrangement of his band's song "different... from the original".

Timeline

 Order of performances

Elton John – "Your Song"
Duran Duran – "(Reach Up for the) Sunrise", "Wild Boys" and "Rio"
James Morrison – "You Give Me Something" and "Wonderful World"
Lily Allen – "LDN" and "Smile"
Fergie – "Glamorous" and "Big Girls Don't Cry"
The Feeling – "Fill My Little World" and "Love It When You Call"
Pharrell Williams – "Drop It Like It's Hot" and "She Wants To Move (Remix)"
Nelly Furtado – "Say It Right", "I'm Like a Bird" and "Maneater"
English National Ballet – "Swan Lake" (Act IV)
Status Quo – "Rockin' All Over the World"
Joss Stone – "You Had Me" and "Under Pressure"
Roger Hodgson –  Supertramp Medley ("Dreamer", "The Logical Song" and "Breakfast in America") and "Give a Little Bit"
Orson – "Happiness" and "No Tomorrow"
Tom Jones – "Kiss", "I Bet You Look Good on the Dancefloor" and "Ain't That A Lot of Love?" (with Joss Stone)
Will Young – "Switch It On"
Natasha Bedingfield – "Unwritten"
Bryan Ferry – "Slave to Love", "Make You Feel My Love" and "Let's Stick Together"
Anastacia – "Superstar"
Connie Fisher and Andrea Ross – "Memory"
Andrea Bocelli – "The Music of the Night"
Josh Groban and Sarah Brightman – "All I Ask of You"
Donny Osmond, Jason Donovan, Lee Mead and Chickenshed – "Any Dream Will Do"
Rod Stewart – "Maggie May", "Baby Jane" and "Sailing"
Kanye West – "Gold Digger", " Touch the Sky", "Stronger", "Diamonds from Sierra Leone" and "Jesus Walks"
P. Diddy – "I'll Be Missing You"
Take That – "Shine", "Patience" and "Back for Good"
Ricky Gervais – "Freelove Freeway" (with Mackenzie Crook), "Chubby Little Loser"
Elton John – "Saturday Night's Alright For Fighting" "Tiny Dancer" "Are You Ready For Love"

 Order of speakers

Prince William and Prince Harry
Sienna Miller and Dennis Hopper
Kiefer Sutherland
Ryan Seacrest, Simon Cowell and Randy Jackson
Natasha Kaplinsky
Dennis Hopper
Fearne Cotton
Gillian Anderson
Boris Becker and John McEnroe
Cat Deeley
Patsy Kensit
Jamie Oliver
David Beckham
Ben Stiller
Prince William and Prince Harry
Ricky Gervais
Nelson Mandela
Bill Clinton
Tony Blair

Attendees
Prince William
Prince Harry
Queen Elizabeth II
Princess Beatrice of York
Zara Phillips
Peter Phillips
Sarah, Duchess of York
Princess Eugenie of York
Members of the Spencer family
Catherine Middleton (since 2022 Princess of Wales) with parents Carole and Michael Middleton, her younger brother James William Middleton and younger sister Philippa Charlotte Matthews
Chelsy Davy
Kiefer Sutherland
Jason Donovan
David Furnish
Mike Tindall
Autumn Kelly
Peaches Geldof
David Beckham
The Carpenters 

Diana's former husband Charles III (then Charles, Prince of Wales) was not among the spectators. Together with the Queen, then Prime Minister Gordon Brown and his predecessor Tony Blair, he was among the guests at the Diana, Princess of Wales memorial service on 31 August 2007 in the Guards Chapel.

Broadcasting
The concert was broadcast in 140 countries. Jamie Theakston, Fearne Cotton and Claudia Winkleman presented for the BBC and many other television channels across the world. In the United States, VH1's coverage was presented by Aamer Haleem, Kate Thornton and Dave Berry.

Australia
Foxtel on FOX8 in Australia, which was hosted by Molly Meldrum (with a highlights package broadcast by the Nine Network).

Canada
In Canada, the concert was broadcast live on CTV with a two-hour primetime special highlighting the best performances. The concert reached 2.8 million viewers and the primetime recap peaked at nearly 1 million viewers.

Italy
Unlike other international events, the Concert for Diana wasn't broadcast by RAI. The live feed was aired by satellite broadcaster Sky Italia on its Sky Vivo channel from 17:00 to 23:00. The concert was also broadcast on commercial radio by RTL 102.5.

United Kingdom
In the United Kingdom the concert was broadcast on BBC One, BBC HD and BBC Radio 2.

The concert was watched by an average of 8.9 million viewers, and peaked with 14.8 million. Over the 8-hour period it had a 44% viewing share. It received considerably more viewers than the Live Earth concert which was broadcast a week later.

United States
In the US, MTV Live and VH1 broadcast the concert live from 11 am (EDT). The concert drew near double the viewing figures for the 2005 Live 8 concert with 1.4 million average over the 8 hours.

NBC broadcast a highlights show between 8 pm-11 pm EDT. The NBC showing was the US most watched programme, averaging 8.7 million viewers.

Other countries
VH1 Latin America broadcast the concert in Latin America, the Caribbean and Central America.

DStv carried it in Africa by showing it on a dedicated channel for the event. Prior to the concert there were television specials on the channel. Star TV throughout Asia, except Japan where it was shown by WOWOW.

A number of broadcasters showed the concert in Europe. Some countries saw the entire show live, others had only highlights. In Germany the broadcaster RTL II showed the highlights from 8.15 pm- 12.15 am CEST

Ricky Gervais
As with many live televised events, the Concert for Diana had a few technical problems, the most infamous of which occurred during comedian Ricky Gervais's monologue, before Elton John's musical finale. As a planned seven-minute routine became twelve minutes, viewers saw a nervous Gervais being forced to fill time, as a stagehand held up signs saying 'two minutes', then 'one minute'. Gervais performed a rendition of a song that David Bowie performed on his show Extras before finally being told to 'throw to the BBC' and presenters Claudia Winkleman and Jamie Theakston. During the extended piece, he performed his iconic "dance" from The Office.

Charities
All net proceeds from the Concert went to the charities chosen by Princes William and Harry. These charities include Diana, Princess of Wales Memorial Fund, Centrepoint and Sentebale, a charity founded in April 2006, by Prince Harry and Lesotho's Prince Seeiso. It helps vulnerable children and young people in Lesotho – particularly those orphaned as a result of AIDS.

During the airing of the concert, Diana was hailed for her generous charity work with the Chain of Hope, Luton Indoor Bowling Club, and British Deaf Association charities. She was also celebrated for her work with the British Red Cross in helping get the word out on land mines in Angola.

See also
Diana, Princess of Wales Tribute Concert, a 1998 concert held at Althorp Park

References

External links
 Concert for Diana official news and information site (Archived)
 BBC coverage

Benefit concerts in the United Kingdom
Memorials to Diana, Princess of Wales
2007 in music
2007 in London
English National Ballet
Concerts at Wembley Stadium
Tribute concerts in the United Kingdom
July 2007 events in the United Kingdom